Arwa is an Arabic feminine name. It means "gracefulness and beauty", "satisfied", and “fresh".

People
Arwa bint Abdul Muttalib, an aunt of the Islamic prophet Muhammad
Arwa bint Kurayz, cousin of Muhammad and mother of Uthman
Arwa bint al-Harith, relative of Muhammad
Arwa bint Mansur al-Himyari (735–died 764), wife of Abbasid caliph al-Mansur, who ruled the Islamic world from 754 to 775, and mother of third Abbasid caliph al-Mahdi
 Arwa bint Harun al-Rashid, was the daughter of Abbasid caliph Harun al-Rashid, her mother was Hulab. She was also half sister of Caliph al-Amin and al-Ma'mun.
Umm Jamil, also known as Arwā, wife of Abū Lahab
Arwa (singer), Yemeni singer
Arwa al-Sulayhi, queen of Yemen 1067–1138
Arwa Damon, news journalist
Arwa Othman, Yemeni writer, journalist, human rights activist and former Minister of Culture

Places
Arwa (village), a village in Saudi Arabia
Arwa (mountain), a mountain in southern Saudi Arabia

Other
Arwa (water), a bottled water brand by the Coca-Cola Company
 ARWA, the honorific used by an Associate of the Royal West of England Academy

Arabic feminine given names